Kandangan is a district and the regency seat of South Hulu Sungai Regency in South Kalimantan province. The district has an area of 106.71 square kilometers. According to mid 2021 estimates, the population of the district was 49,204 people spread across 18 villages.

History

Ibnu Hadjar Insurgency 
Around the end of October and early November 1950, Kandangan was invaded three times by KjRT forces led by Ibnu Hadjar in response to the government's military operations to quell the insurgency. On 12 December 1953, KjRT attacked Kandangan from four directions.

Geography 
The district borders Angkinang district of Central Hulu Sungai Regency in the north and east, Sungai Raya district in the south, and South Daha district in the west.

Climate
Kandangan has a tropical rainforest climate (Af) with moderate rainfall in August and September and heavy rainfall in the remaining months.

Demographics 
According to Statistics Indonesia, population estimates of the district on 2019 was 51,847. This consisted of 25,808 male population and 26,039 female population. Compared to 2018 figure, the amount of population was a slight increase of 0.936%. Gender ratio as of 2019 was there are 99 male population for every 100 female population. Majority of district population is muslim with figure of 99.64% on 2019. However, there are minorities such as Hindu, Buddhist, and Christiant population. Kandangan Kota is the most dense subdistrict with density of 3,830 per square kilometers while the least dense subdistrict was Bangkau village with figure 93 per square kilometers.

Economy 
Agriculture & plantation is an important part of the district's economy, as there were 4,482 hectares of irrigated paddy fields in the district. On 2018, the district produced 18,620 tons from paddy fields and 287 tons of cassava. Other than that, the district also produces 4,430 tons of chili, 209 tons of citrus fruit, and 1,078 tons of coconut. Livestock population in the district consisted of cows with population of 561, goats with population of 738, and chicken with population of 85,614. Fish catch in the district was 2,017 tons while farmed fish was 176 tons. Other productions include spinach, tomato, cucumber, and banana.

There are eight hotels and 154 registered restaurants in the district as of 2019. Other than that, there are also 57 registered cooperatives, seven state-owned bank branches, two private bank branches, and one BPR (People's Credit Bank).

Governance 

As a district, it is a third-level administrative region under a regency. A district head (camat) is appointed directly by the regent with recommendation from the regency secretary. Kandangan itself has no parliament. It is divided into 18 subdistricts; consist of 14 villages (desa) and 4 urban villages (kelurahan), differences between the two are merely name and that of village is more rural and less populated than urban village. On administrative level, they both are equal subdivision. Below are the list of subdistricts.

Urban villages (Kelurahan) 

 Jambu Hilir
 West Kandangan
 Kandangan Kota
 North Kandangan

Villages (Desa) 

 Amawang Kanan
 Amawang Kiri
 Amawang Kiri Muka
 Baluti
 Bangkau
 Bariang
 Gambah Dalam
 West Gambah Dalam
 Gambah Luar
 Gambah Luar Muka
 Lungau
 Sungai Kupang
 Sungai Paring
 Tibung Raya
On regency level, the district is part of South Hulu Sungai 1st electoral district together with Sungai Raya, Simpur, and Kalumpang, sends 11 out of 30 representatives to regency's parliament. The last election was on 2019 and the next one would be on 2024.

Infrastructure 

There are 50 elementary schools, 13 junior highschools, 5 senior highschools, and 2 vocational higshcools in the district. There's only one higher education institution in the district, Darul Umum Islamic College. On healthcare, the district has two hospitals; one of them is a maternity hospital, ten puskesmas, and 14 healthcare centers. In addition, there are 12 registered pharmacies. There are exactly 158 mosques and one church in the district. All 18 subdistricts and villages within the district has access to electricity and the main road has adequate street lamp as of 2019. All electricity is supplied and subsidized by Perusahaan Listrik Negara, state-owned electric company.

Total length of roads in the district is 131.27 kilometers, from which all have been paved with asphalt and in general have good condition according to Statistics Indonesia on 2019. There are 28 operational base transceiver station in the district as of 2019, and the district have access to 4G as of 2018.

References

Populated places in South Kalimantan
Regency seats of South Kalimantan